Ladatheca is a genus of hyolith that closely resembles Turcutheca.
It has a straight conch with a smooth internal surface, and is found with what may be its operculum.

References 

Prehistoric protostome genera
Paleozoic invertebrates
Paleozoic life of Newfoundland and Labrador
Paleozoic life of Nova Scotia
Hyolitha